The Bay-Lakes Council is the Boy Scouts of America (BSA) council serving eastern Wisconsin and the Upper Peninsula of Michigan. Headquartered in Appleton, Wisconsin, it is geographically one of the largest local BSA councils. Bay-Lakes Council #635 was formed on July 1, 1973, the product of a merger between six east Wisconsin councils. The council is served by Kon Wapos Lodge #635 of the Order of the Arrow.

History

The Sturgeon Bay Council was formed in 1918. It disbanded in 1919.. The Bay-Lakes Council was formed in 1973 by a merger of the following councils: Badger (based in Fond du Lac), Waumegesako (based in Manitowoc), Nicolet Area (based in Green Bay), Valley (based in Menasha), Twin Lakes (based in Oshkosh), and Kettle Moraine (based in Sheboygan). The Hiawathaland Council joined in 2012. The history of each of these parent councils is depicted below.

Organization
Bay-Lakes Council has a professional staff of approximately 26 people. There are over 13,000 Scouts in the council's 23 counties in Eastern Wisconsin, and 14 counties (all but Gogebic) in Michigan's upper peninsula. There are 320 Cub Scout packs, 230 Scouts BSA troops, 90 Venturing crews and 75 Explorer posts and over 6,000 adult volunteers.

Districts
Bay-Lakes Council is divided into eight districts.
 Gathering Waters District covers parts of Calumet, Winnebago & Waupaca and all of Outagamie and Shawano counties.
 Hiawathaland District covers Michigan's upper peninsula; formerly Hiawathaland Council.
 Kettle Country District covers Ozaukee county, and parts of Dodge and Washington counties.
 Lakeshore District covers Calumet, Manitowoc and Sheboygan counties.
 Ledge to Lakes District covers Fond du Lac, Green Lake, and Marquette counties.
 Northern Lights District covers Marinette, Oconto and Langlade Counties and part of Menominee county in Upper Michigan.
 Twin Lakes District covers Waupaca, Waushara, and Winnebago counties.
 Voyageur District covers Brown, Door and Kewaunee counties.

Camps

The Bay-Lakes Council offers five main summer camp programs:
 Cub Scout World Camp Rokilio, a Cub Scout resident camp
 Gardner Dam Scout Camp, a Webelos resident camp and offers many high-adventure activities in partnership with Bear Paw Scout Camp
 Bear Paw Scout Camp, week-long summer resident camping for Scouts BSA
 Camp Hiawatha for Scouts BSA, Cub Scout resident camping and high-adventure activities in the Upper Peninsula of Michigan.

As well as one group camp without a summer program:
 JAX Camp in Door County is a base for high adventure such as sea kayaking and sailing.

Bear Paw Scout Camp

In addition to rustic campsites and heated cabins for camping, Bear Paw has several permanent buildings supporting its program areas, a trading post for snacks and memorabilia, an enclosed chapel on a wooded point overlooking the water, a large and modern dining hall, a lakeside fire circle for evening council fires and ceremonies, and a nine-hole disc golf course. Hiking trails range from short, in-camp jaunts to destinations such as Explorer Point to longer treks to Oconto County features such as Lost Mountain, Staff Mountain, and Waupee Rapids.

Besides summer camp weeks, Bear Paw's sixteen campsites and four heated cabins can be rented by Scouts. Some events and programs offered throughout the year include shooting sports, Maple Syrup Days, Cooking merit badge, Paul Bunyan Woodsman Award, geocaching, orienteering, and wilderness search and rescue.

The camp has a website.

Gardner Dam Scout Camp
As of 2019 Gardner Dam Scout Camp hosts the summer Webelos program which was held before at Camp Twin Lakes.

Opened in 1932, Gardner Dam Scout Camp is located along the Wolf River, near the village of White Lake, in the town of Wolf River, Langlade County. Gardner Dam offers a variety of programs including many high adventure opportunities including rock climbing, bouldering, whitewater tubing, whitewater kayaking, whitewater canoeing, and ATVs. Gardner Dam also offers shooting sports ranges for shotgun, rifle, and archery, as well as a host of trails for hiking and biking. The camp inhabits both sides of the river with one side being dedicated to campsites and the other side being dedicated to the numerous program areas. When Gardner Dam first opened in 1932, it was a dining hall camp. Then in 1970, it changed to a patrol cooking camp for then-Boy Scout troops (now Scouts BSA troops) where troops would pick up their food from the commissary each meal and cook in their campsite. With the change in summer programs to Webelos, a dining hall is going to be erected on the north side of the Wolf River. There is a man-made pond fed directly from the Wolf River. The water flows freely through the pond and is held in by a dam. Because of this design, the water avoids becoming stagnant, because fresh water is constantly being fed from the river. Gardner Dam also has a  climbing tower available for Climbing merit badge and climbing during free time. In 2008 a new shooting sports facility was built. The shooting sports area has a section for both rifle shooting and shotgun trap shooting. The camp is also available in spring, fall, and winter months for Scout troops and non-Scouting groups to come and camp on their own. In the non-summer months, units may stay in either the older Wisconsin Electric lodge, or the newer Wausau Homes Adventure Lodge (WHAL - pronounced Wall), both of which have indoor bathrooms including showers.

The campsites and program areas are home to 13 sessions of four-day, three-night Webelos resident camp from June through August, and weekend use by all units the remainder of the year.

Camp Rokilio
This camp was founded in 1924 as a Boy Scout Camp. Original funding came from several service clubs: the Rotary, Kiwanis, Lions, and later the Optimist clubs, hence the name Rokilio. Cabins were built and Rokilio became a winter destination as well. Sledding down the driveway from the cabins to the dining hall became classic. The camp is on Cedar Lake and has a waterfront. In the late 1990s, Cub Scout day camp moved from Twin Lakes, and Cub Scout World at Rokilio was created. The camp features six program theme buildings: Fort J.J. Keller, Gunderson Viking Bäten, Knauf Space Station, Kohler Castle, and Oertle Train Station. The sixth, Gold Miner's Village, is no longer in use due to the Webelos program at Gardner Dam Scout Camp.

The buildings are home to 13 sessions of four-day and three-night Cub Scout resident camp from June through August, and weekend use by all units the remainder of the year. Camp Rokilio offers waterfront activities in Cedar Lake, BB guns and archery ranges, and a natural bog conducive to nature hikes and environmental studies.

Camp Hiawatha
Founded in 1967, this camp consists of 800 acres around Bunting Lake in the Hiawatha National Forest south of Munising, Michigan. The camp provides eight developed campsites for Scouts BSA and Cub Scout resident camps, a number of buildings to serve the programs and activities, and a few cabins that can be rented by families.

JAX Camp 

JAX Camp is a rustic weekend camp that offers basic amenities, and is located in Door County near Sturgeon Bay, in the town of Sevastopol.

Former camps

The following properties were originally owned by the council (or one of its predecessor councils) or operated by the council as a camp:
 Camp Maywood-Wilderness, founded 1970, (over 200 acres near Wautoma) was primarily used for Wood Badge and JLT courses.  In addition to some rustic campsites, it had a heated barn with kitchen and bunkhouse, a pavilion, a private lake, hiking trails, and geocaching. The camp was sold to private buyers in 2014 as a part of the Imagine 2024 initiative, and some of its assets given to the other Bay-Lakes camps.
 Camp Sinawa is now a privately run camp in Valders, WI. Sites are rented out by the public and various youth groups.
 Camp Shaginappi, used by the former Badger Council, was on Pipe Creek and is now a county park.
 Camp Red Buck was an early Boy Scout summer camp located on Scout, Council, and Red Jacket Lakes in Michigan's Upper Peninsula near Munising. The camp was closed with the opening of Camp Hiawatha. The site is currently occupied by the Council Lake Dispersed Campsite in the Hiawatha National Forest.
 Camp Twin Lakes was located on County Road K, 11 miles (18 km) south of Waupaca, WI, on 425 acres (1.72 km2) of woods and meadowland, with three lakes that were used for swimming, boating, canoeing, and fishing. It was developed into sixteen campsites ranging from improved sites for group camping to leave-no-trace sites for backpacking to family campsites for registered Scouters and family.  It also had several hiking trails and three winter buildings, two housing twenty-four people and one for eighteen.  Originally designed for Cub Scout Day Camp, Camp Twin Lakes was later used as the home of Twin Lakes Webelos Resident Camp. Camp Twin Lakes, which by April 2018 was being leased for use as the Webelos Summer Camp, was moved to Gardner Dam Scout Camp as part of the Imagine 2024 (later Growing Future Leaders) initiative.

Order of the Arrow
Bay-Lakes Council is served by the Kon Wapos Lodge of the Order of the Arrow.  The Kon Wapos totem is the snow shoe hare, and the lodge does not use a lodge number. For administrative purpose, the council number of 635, but it is not the lodge number. This lodge was formed as the 2013 merger of Ag-Im and Awase lodges.

Awase Lodge #61 was chartered on January 1, 1974. The name Awase, originally derived from the word owasse, which means "bear" in the Menominee Indian language, was adopted as the name for this lodge, which was created as new lodge, due to the merger of the six Northeast Wisconsin Councils. The original lodges, Shaginappi, Sinawa, Chequah, Wa Zi Ya Ta, Day Noomp, and Wolverine chose lodge #61 for the new Awase Lodge. Some arrowmen have chosen to correlate the lodge number "61" to signify "six lodges to one" (circa 2010).

Ag-Im Lodge #156 was formed in 1945 from Northwoods Circle Lodge #156 (originally part of Copper Country Council), Ottawa Lodge #198 (originally part of Iron Range Council), and Minnewasco Lodge #250 (originally part of Red Buck Council).

The ancestry of each of these lodges is depicted below.

Growing Future Leaders Capital Campaign 

The primary mission of the Growing Future Leaders Capital Campaign (formally Imagine 2024) as stated by its website:"The mission of the “Imagine 2024” Plan is to enhance Council properties ensuring that they support and complement a diverse year-round program offering. This plan will focus on: Fiscal responsibility of valuable Council resources; Utilization of the unique natural qualities of each property, as well as surrounding program opportunities to enhance program offerings; Provide continuous improvement to allow for growth and flexibility of the plan as needs change; and Create sustainable camp models..."As of June 2016, the following changes were made:
 The Dining Hall at Camp Rokilio had its roof replaced.
 Camp Maywood-Wilderness was sold.
 20 acres of JAX camp were sold.

As of October 2019, a new welcome center and multiple purpose building was built in Camp Rokilio.

Additional changes announced to be completed after June 1, 2018:

 Boy Scout Summer Program at Camp Gardner Dam to move to Camp Bear Paw
 Boy Scout Summer Program at Camp Hiawatha to Camp Bear Paw when new high adventure base camp programs are ready
 Webelos Summer Program at Camp Twin Lakes to Camp Gardner Dam (completed)
 Hiawatha Adventure Base Camp at Camp Hiawatha

See also
 Scouting in Wisconsin
 Local council camps of the Boy Scouts of America - Wisconsin

External links

References

Local councils of the Boy Scouts of America
Central Region (Boy Scouts of America)
Youth organizations based in Wisconsin
1973 establishments in Wisconsin